Why Things Bite Back: Technology and the Revenge of Unintended Consequences is a 1997 book by former executive editor for physical science and history at Princeton University Press Edward Tenner that is an account and geography of modern technology.

Edward Tenner's book describes how technology has had unintended effects on society.

See also
Technopoly: The Surrender of Culture to Technology

References

Further reading 
 
 Basson, M.S. (1995) South African Water Transfer Schemes and their Impact on the Southern African Region, in Matiza, T., Craft, S. & Dale, P. (Eds.) Water Resource Use in the Zambezi Basin. Proceedings of a Workshop held in Kasane, Botswana, 28 April - 2 May 1993. Gland, Switzerland: IUCN.
 Blanchon, D. & Turton, A.R. (2005) Les Transferts Massifs d’Eau en Afrique du Sud. In Lasserre, F. (Ed.) Transferts Massifs d’Eau: Outils de Development ou Instruments de Pouvoir? (In French). Sainte-Foy, Quebéc: Presses de l’Université du Québec. (Pp 247 – 283). 
 
 Heyns, P. (2002) Interbasin Transfer of Water Between SADC Countries: A Development Challenge for the Future. In Turton, A.R. & Henwood, R. (Eds.) Hydropolitics in the Developing World: A Southern African Perspective. Pretoria: African Water Issues Research Unit (AWIRU). pp157–176.

External links 
 Why Things Bite Back at Randomhouse.com
 Why Things Bite Back's Author Interview by AmericanHeritage.com

1997 non-fiction books
Social sciences books